Perctarit (also Berthari) (died 688) was king of the Lombards from 661 to 662 the first time and later from 671 to 688.

He was the son and successor of Aripert I.  He shared power with his brother Godepert.  He was a Catholic, whereas Godepert was an Arian.  He ruled from Milan, Godepert from Pavia.  Godepert called for the aid of Duke Grimoald I of Benevento in a war with Perctarit, but the Beneventan had him assassinated and took control of the kingdom, forcing Perctarit to flee.

Perctarit first arrived at the court of the Avar khagan Kakar.  Meanwhile, his wife, Rodelinde, and their son Cunincpert were captured by Grimoald and sent to Benevento.  Perctarit returned soon thereafter to conspire against Grimoald, but fled again to Francia.  When Grimoald concluded a treaty with the Franks, Perctarit prepared to flee to Britain, but news of Grimoald's death reached him first.

In 671, Perctarit returned from exile and reclaimed his realm, which was being ruled on behalf of Grimoald's son Garibald.  He made Catholicism the official religion, but did not recognise papal authority.  He made peace with the Byzantines and associated Cunincpert with the throne in 678.  He sought to put down the rebellion of Alagis, duke of Trent. It was to be his only campaign; he captured the duke, then pardoned and released him. Perctarit was assassinated in 688 by a conspiracy.

His daughter Wigilinda married Duke Grimoald II of Benevento, son of Romuald I of Benevento.  Perctarit's reign is not noted for its military accomplishments, but for his religious endowments.  He built the churches of Saint Agatha and the Virgin (outside the walls) at Pavia.  He was succeeded by his more warlike son, who was to fight to no avail against the man his father had caught and let go.  Perctarit and Rodelinde themselves were to live on in opera as the Bertarido and Rodelinda of Handel's Rodelinda, Regina de' Longobardi, though not much of their actual history survived in Nicola Francesco Haym's libretto, drawn more from Pierre Corneille's Pertharite than from Historia Langobardorum. He was buried in the Basilica of Santissimo Salvatore in Pavia.

References

Notes

Sources
 

688 deaths
7th-century Lombard monarchs
Lombard warriors
Bavarian dynasty
Year of birth unknown